The 1997 Pontins Professional was the twenty-fourth edition of the professional invitational snooker tournament, which took place between 12 and 16 May 1997 at Pontin's in Prestatyn, Wales.

The tournament featured eight professional players. The quarter-final matches were contested over the best of 9 frames, the semi-final matches over the best of 11 frames, and the final over the best of 17 frames.

Martin Clark, who was a last-minute replacement for Darren Morgan, won the event for the first time, beating Andy Hicks 9–7 in the final.

Main draw

References

Pontins Professional
Snooker competitions in Wales
Pontins Professional
Pontins Professional
Pontins Professional